Tulocay Cemetery is a cemetery located in Napa, California originally established in 1859 following Governor pro tem Manuel Jimeno to Cayetano Juárez's 1853 donation of approximately  of land to the people of Napa.

History

The cemetery is located on land that was originally part of Rancho Tulucay, a Mexican land grant.

Notable interments
Several notable people are interred or entombed in the Tulocay cemetery.

Lilburn Boggs, former Governor of Missouri, former member of California State Assembly
James Clyman, California pioneer
Nathan Coombs, California pioneer, founder of the city of Napa, California
Frank Coombs, Former United States Representative
George Washington Gift, U. S. Navy officer, writer, banker, civil engineer, politician, Confederate Navy officer, businessman, and newspaper editor
Henry William Heisch, Medal of Honor recipient
John Patchett, founder of first commercial vineyard and winery in Napa County
Mary Ellen Pleasant, 19th-century African American entrepreneur and abolitionist

References

History of Napa County, California
Napa Valley
Cemeteries in Napa County, California
1859 establishments in California